Canagasabapathy Visuvalingam Vigneswaran, PC (born 23 October 1939) is a Sri Lankan Tamil lawyer, judge, politician and Member of Parliament. After practising law for more than 15 years, Vigneswaran was a member of the judiciary for 25 years. He was a magistrate and a judge of the District Court, High Court, Court of Appeal and Supreme Court. He was Chief Minister of the Northern Province from October 2013 to October 2018. He was elected to the Parliament of Sri Lanka in August 2020. Vigneswaran is leader of the Tamil People's Alliance and the Tamil People's National Alliance.

Early life and family
Vigneswaran was born on 23 October 1939 in Hulftsdorp, Colombo, the capital of Ceylon. His parents were born in Manipay in northern Ceylon and he had two sisters. His father Canagasabapathy was a public official who worked in several parts of the country. Vigneswaran's grandfather was a cousin of statesmen P. Ramanathan and P. Arunachalam.

Vigneswaran's father's work meant that the family moved often. Vigneswaran spent the first nine years of his life in Kurunegala and studied at Christchurch College. The family then moved to Anuradhapura where Vigneswaran attended Holy Family Convent. Vigneswaran joined Royal College, Colombo aged 11. After school Vigneswaran obtained B.A. degree from the University of London and LL.B. degree from the University of Ceylon. He then joined Ceylon Law College, qualifying as a proctor and an advocate. He was president of the Law Students’ Union at the college in 1962.

One of Vigneswaran's sons is married to the daughter of government minister Vasudeva Nanayakkara. His other son is married to the niece of former MP Keseralal Gunasekera.

Vigneswaran is also a follower of the controversial guru Swami Premananda whom he has compared to Jesus and has requested that Indian Prime Minister Narendra Modi release three jailed followers of Premananda.

Career

Law
Vigneswaran practised of law for more than fifteen years. He is a President's Counsel. He joined the Judicial Service on 7 May 1979. He served as a magistrate and District Judge in Batticaloa, Chavakachcheri and Mallakam. He became District Judge for Colombo in January 1987. He was appointed to the High Court in 1988, serving in Northern Province, Eastern, North Central, Uva and Western provinces. He was appointed to the Court of Appeal in 1995.

Vigneswaran was appointed to the Supreme Court in March 2001. He retired in October 2004.

Politics

In April 2013 it was reported that Vigneswaran had been chosen by the Tamil National Alliance (TNA) to be its chief ministerial candidate in the upcoming election to Northern Provincial Council (NPC). The reports were denied by the TNA. However, in July 2013, after nominations were called for the provincial council election, the TNA announced that Vigneswaran would be its chief ministerial candidate in the Northern Province. He contested the provincial council election as one of the TNA's candidates in Jaffna District and was elected to the NPC. Vigneswaran received his chief ministerial appointment letter from Governor G. A. Chandrasiri on 1 October 2013. He took his oath as chief minister and provincial councillor in front of President Mahinda Rajapaksa at the Presidential Secretariat on 7 October 2013.

Vigneswaran's relationship with the TNA leadership deteriorated thereafter. In December 2015 he became leader of the newly formed Tamil People's Council (TPC), a forum to highlight issues affecting Sri Lankan Tamils. The TPC, which included civil society groups, religious leaders and academics as well as political parties, claimed that it wasn't political or an alternative to the TNA. On 24 October 2018, the day after he ceased being chief minister, Vigneswaran announced that he had formed a new political alliance, the Tamil People's Alliance (TPA, Thamizh Makkal Kootani).

In February 2020 the TPA joined with three other political parties to form the Tamil People's National Alliance (TPNA, Thamizh Makkal Tesiya Kootani) electoral alliance to contest the parliamentary election. Vigneswaran became the alliance's leader. He contested the 2020 parliamentary election as one of the TPNA's candidates in Jaffna District and was elected to the Parliament.

Electoral history

References

1939 births
Alumni of Ceylon Law College
Alumni of Royal College, Colombo
Alumni of the University of Ceylon
Ceylonese advocates
Ceylonese proctors
Chief Ministers of Northern Province, Sri Lanka
Court of Appeal of Sri Lanka judges
District Courts of Sri Lanka judges
High Courts of Sri Lanka judges
Illankai Tamil Arasu Kachchi politicians
Living people
Magistrates of Sri Lanka
Members of the 16th Parliament of Sri Lanka
People from Colombo
People from British Ceylon
President's Counsels (Sri Lanka)
Puisne Justices of the Supreme Court of Sri Lanka
Sri Lankan Hindus
Sri Lankan Tamil judges
Sri Lankan Tamil lawyers
Sri Lankan Tamil politicians
Tamil National Alliance politicians